The 1938 Gonzaga Bulldogs football team was an American football team that represented Gonzaga University as an independent during the 1938 college football season. In their eighth and final year under head coach Mike Pecarovich, the Bulldogs compiled a 1–7 record and were outscored by a total of 105 to 82.

Schedule

References

Gonzaga
Gonzaga Bulldogs football seasons
Gonzaga Bulldogs football